The Blue Mountains Mystery is a lost 1921 Australian silent film directed by Raymond Longford and co-directed by Lottie Lyell.

The film was derived from the 1919 novel The Mount Marunga Mystery by Harrison Owen. It is considered a lost film.

Plot
The Blue Mountains Mystery involves the alleged murder of a wealthy businessman, Henry Tracey, and the eventual discovery that the victim was an underworld look-alike impersonator. The main suspects are Tracey's ward, Pauline, Mrs Tracey, and Pauline's boyfriend, Hector, and his rival, Richard Maxim.

Eventually the supposedly dead Henry Tracey reappears and announces that he had been kidnapped. The corpse was Stephen Rodder, a man with a strong resemblance to Tracey.

Cast
Marjorie Osborne as Mrs Tracey
John Faulkner as Henry Tracey/Stephen Rodder
Vivian Edwards as Hector Blunt
Bernice Vere as Pauline Tracey
Billy Williams as Richard Maxim
Redmond Barry as detective
John de Lacey as Captain Banks
Ivy Shilling as dancer

Production
The movie was mostly filmed in Katoomba, the Blue Mountains and Sydney Harbour, with some studio work at the Carrolls' Palmerston studio in Sydney. The Carrington Hotel and Hydro-Majestic Hotel were featured. Shooting took an unusually long time to complete, in part because of the location work involved.

Marjorie Osborne was a fashion consultant to the Sydney store of Farmer's, and wife of a wealthy land-owner, Henry Hill Osborne. She unsuccessfully attempted a Hollywood career after making this film.

It was Longford's third production for E.J. Carroll and the first in which Lyell received a formal co-direction credit. According to the book Australian Cinema: The First 80 Years by Graham Shirley and Brian Adams, the film cost almost double that of The Sentimental Bloke (1919).

Reception
The film was popular at the box office in Australia.

Although now lost, at the time of its release The Blue Mountains Mystery fared well in the United Kingdom, South America and the United States upon its initial release. The London Bioscope wrote of The Blue Mountains Mystery: " …by its restrained acting, shows the force which a story gains in the telling. As a consequence, suspense is held throughout". The reviewer of the Los Angeles Times said the film "will keep you on the edge of your seat to the last fade out."

Actress Marjorie Osborne was admirable of Lottie Lyell's contributions for The Blue Mountains Mystery. She said of her: "I like brains in a woman, and she has them. Her work on this picture is more on the directing side than the acting. She assists Mr. Longford, and the two of them have plenty of healthy argument when their ideas about a scene are different." The November 1921 edition of the Picture Show magazine also praised Lyell as being "enthusiastic, original, possessing charm and common sense" for her writing of the screenplay.

Harrison Owen was unimpressed with the film, which he thought poorly made compared to overseas movies.

The Carrolls withdrew from production after this film and concentrated on distribution and exhibition.

Resources

References

External links
Raymond Longford & Lottie Lyell by William M. Drew

The Blue Mountains Mystery at Silent Era.com
The Blue Mountains Mystery at AustLit
The Mount Marunga Mystery full text on archive.org

1921 films
Australian drama films
Australian silent feature films
Australian black-and-white films
Films based on Australian novels
Films directed by Raymond Longford
Lost Australian films
Katoomba, New South Wales
1921 drama films
1921 lost films
Lost drama films
History of the Blue Mountains (New South Wales)
Silent drama films